DZMM (630 AM) Radyo Patrol was a commercial news/talk radio station broadcasting from Quezon City, Philippines, serving the Mega Manila market. It was the flagship station of the Radyo Patrol Network owned by ABS-CBN. The station's studio was located at the ABS-CBN Broadcast Center, Sgt. Esguerra Avenue, corner of Mother Ignacia St., Brgy. South Triangle, Diliman, Quezon City; its 50,000-watt transmitter was located at F. Navarette St., Brgy. Panghulo, Obando, Bulacan.

DZMM was simulcast via The Filipino Channel and also has a television channel aired on Sky Cable, Destiny Cable and Sky Direct, and as an exclusive cable news channel named TeleRadyo where the studio and hosts of its programs can be seen by its listeners and viewers. It can also be received in the United States on DirecTV Channel 2066. Some of the station's selected programming were also simulcast via satellite over (Visayas Regions) DYAP Radyo Patrol 765 in Puerto Princesa, Palawan, DYAB Radyo Patrol 1512 in Mandaue City, Cebu, and (Mindanao Region) DXAB Radyo Patrol 1296 in Davao City. (these stations mentioned also broadcasts local programming in-between).

As of May 5, 2020, the station suspended its broadcasting activities, together with that of its free television and sister radio stations, following the cease-and-desist order issued by the National Telecommunications Commission due to the expiration of ABS-CBN's legislative license to operate. At 05:00 (Philippine Standard Time) on May 8, 2020, however, most DZMM programming resumed as an online feed (including audio feed) and through the TeleRadyo channel.

History

Radyo Patrol's first literation: the early years
It began on October 19, 1953, when DZAQ, the forerunner of DZMM was the first radio station of the former ABS (Alto Broadcasting System) of the Quirinos under President Elpidio Quirino's brother, Antonio (originally came from the pre-1953 experimental station DZBC), opened its doors as a radio station using the Filipino language in its broadcasts, following what DZBC had done before as the first-ever radio station in Manila using Filipino instead of the English language used by other stations at that time. DZAQ 620 kHz featured news, variety and music programs on an AM format which then the progenitor of DZAQ-TV 3. Eddie Ilarde, Ike Lozada, German Moreno and Joey de Leon were the personalities of the station at that time. Its first radio studios were in Manila, sharing the same building with the television studios. In 1957, with the opening of the then new ABS radio and television studios in Pasay, the DZAQ radio studios moved there.

Years later, when ABS and the Lopez-owned Chronicle Broadcasting Network (CBN) were formally merged into a single network in 1967, DZAQ 620 kHz switched frequencies with CBN-owned DZXL 960 kHz and was later rebranded as DZAQ Radyo Patrol 960 kHz, one of the pre-martial law flagship AM stations of ABS-CBN until 1972. Orly Mercado, who was one of the station managers from 1969 to 1971, together with Ben Aniceto, came up with a vision to establish a 24-hour all-news and all-talk radio station and ABS-CBN conceptualized it under the Radyo Patrol brand – the de facto successor of the ephemeral 24 hour news station DZQL Radyo Reloj, which CBN launched in 1956 (the very year it launched), and the first-ever 24-hour news radio station in the country and in Southeast Asia.

The first and original Radyo Patrol team was unceremoniously organized following the aftermath of Super Typhoon Welming (International name: Emma) in 1967, at the old ABS-CBN Radio Broadcast Center in Aduana Street, Intramuros, Manila, which housed the station since it was moved in 1958. The then program manager Ben Aniceto and Chief Engineer Emilio Solidum created a solution to broadcast typhoon damage news from Manila and the surrounding areas. Using two Volkswagen Combis attached with a UHF transmitter, two teams of reporters were dispatched. Combi One had Al Mendez and Zoilo Paragas Jr as reporters, and Combi 2 with Bar Samson. DZQL and DZXL became the carrying stations with then current DJs Naldy Castro, Buddy Medina, Boots Baker, Mary Jane Madamba and even the late Ike Lozada alternating as anchors. Cesar Mortega was assigned to coordinate the broadcasts. The broadcasts proved to be a huge success for the corporation, and for its news service.

Then came the magnitude 7.6 earthquake in Casiguran (in which Manila was severely affected by that quake). This strong earthquake lead to the collapse of the Ruby Tower in the capital's downtown districts. This was the second major news event as a progenitor to the current Radyo Patrol; DZAQ took on the gargantuan task of informing the nation live as it happened. The Radyo Patrol Ruby Tower project was then handled by former DZAQ station manager Orly Mercado, and veteran broadcaster Joe Taruc; the first reporters assigned as Radyo Patrol reporters were Mercado himself, Jun Ricafrente, Mario Garcia, Chris Daluz, and Ismael Reyes. The marathon radio-TV simulcast of a major coverage — the first of its kind by a Philippine media firm, was a success, and the Radyo Patrol format later became an integral part of DZAQ's broadcasts, with the station's field reporters being assigned to cover breaking news stories and then calling the station to convey these stories as they happened. Encouraged by the success of the field reports of breaking news stories in the Greater Manila Area and beyond, DZAQ was later that year converted into a 24-hour uninterrupted news and commentary station by orders of the corporation management, covering many national events of great importance to listeners, as DZXL took over its entertainment and music programming. Based on a survey conducted by Seamark, Inc., DZXL was the most popular radio station in the country by mid-1970. At the same time, the original team of 5 field reporters was later expanded to include both young announcers like Rey Langit (now with DZRJ-AM), Ernie Baron, and Manolo Favis (now with Radyo La Verdad 1350), alongside industry news veterans. By 1971, the success of the Radyo Patrol format in the Greater Manila Area had led to select ABS-CBN provincial radio stations establishing Radyo Patrol news services within their areas.

Martial law period and until 1986

However, during the night of September 23, 1972, the operations of DZAQ, DZXL, DZMM-FM, DZAQ-TV and DZXL-TV along with 4 other ABS-CBN AM radio stations were halted as Metrocom forces seized ABS-CBN Broadcasting Center two days after President Ferdinand Marcos declared martial law; DZAQ/DZXL personalities were even arrested because of strict censorship as the stations went off the air.

Two years after the forced shut down of all radio and television stations, DWWW (Radyo Broadcast City), an AM station of Kanlaon Broadcasting System (now known as Radio Philippines Network) signed on the air in 1973 with news, public service programs, drama and music. Veteran anchors and new recruits like Johnny de Leon, Rod Navarro, Joe Taruc and Vic Morales came into DWWW at that time. Dely Magpayo, Henry Jones Ragas, Gel Santos-Relos and Noli de Castro were among those who worked as station announcers.

Under the KBS/RPN control, the station was dubbed Pinakamatatag sa Buong Pilipinas (The strongest in the Philippines). Following the switch of the Philippine AM radio stations from NARBA-implemented 10 kHz spacing (which was used from 1922 up to November 22, 1978) to GE75-implemented 9 kHz spacing on November 23, 1978, DWWW's frequency was reassigned from 620 to 630 AM, and gained a new home in Broadcast City in Diliman, Quezon City.

On the third day of the 1986 EDSA Revolution, reformist rebels stormed into the RPN broadcast complex, forcing DWWW to knock off the air following the capture of MBS 4 on the morning of February 24, 1986, and RPN 9 the day after. At the end, both DWWW of RPN and DWWK-FM of BBC were sequestered by the government with ABS-CBN getting both stations as a result.

The return of ABS-CBN
The fall of the Marcos regime in the immediate aftermath of the People Power Revolution had paved the way for the return of ABS-CBN in the Philippine broadcasting scene. In April 1986, then newly formed Presidential Commission on Good Government handed over two radio stations, DWWW of RPN and DWWK-FM of BBC, back to the network's control. DWWW then changed its callsign to DZMM and started preparations for the resumption of broadcasts. Lito Balquierda Jr., vice-president for radio, together with attorney Jake Lopez and Mr. Ben Aniceto spearheaded the return of the giant network to the local broadcasting scene.

The network started recruiting both experienced and new employees including a new generation of Radyo Patrol Reporters. Their studios were initially located at the Chronicle Building in Pasig. After days of careful planning and a period of test broadcast which took place from July 16–21, 1986 (alongside DWKO-FM 101.9, which started broadcasting and the network's mother TV station ABS-CBN Channel 2, which re-opened on September 14), DZMM officially signed on the air with the new tagline "Ang Himpilan ng Malayang Mamamayan" (Station of the Independent People) on the afternoon of July 22, 1986, at 3 pm.

Rene Jose (now with DWIZ and UNTV) delivered the first sign-on spiels, while Magpayo (who came from DWWW) was the first-ever anchor to grace the airwaves of the new station with her program Dear Tiya Dely (before she transferred to DZRH to continue her program until her death in September 2008), followed by other broadcast icons like Jun Ricafrente (who also became one of the original reporters of the pre-Martial Law Radyo Patrol era), Cesar Mortega, Ric Tierro and de Castro, newly recruited women Mel Tiangco (now with GMA Network) and Angelique Lazo (now with Radyo Veritas and PTV), as well as Ernie Baron and Kuya Cesar. Knowledge Power, the first-ever full-length program of the station was launched. It was also the country's first-ever scholastic program on AM radio. Mario Garcia, who was part of the original Radyo Patrol core and recruited from DWAN 1206, was the first station manager, months after its reopening.

It was only in 1987 that the station was transferred to its current studios inside the ABS-CBN Broadcast Center in Quezon City from the former Chronicle Building in Ortigas Center, Pasig. During its first years of operations, DZMM operated from sign-on to sign-off on a 19-hour-a-day to 20-hour-a-day schedule during that time.

In 1987, the first-ever tandem on local AM radio was introduced. Mel Tiangco and Jay Sonza were the hosts of Mel & Jay and immediately became a hit to the listeners and lasted for a couple of years. It was also in the same year when DZMM build a remarkable roster of radio talents, including Ted Failon (now with Radyo Singko 92.3 News FM), Korina Sanchez, Frankie Evangelista, Gel Santos-Relos, Ernie Angeles (who also served its station's voice over during its first decade of operations), Neil Ocampo (deceased) and Jake Maderazo (now with Radyo Pilipino).

As it was in the past, DZMM held on the tradition of the stalwart ABS-CBN Radyo Patrol (field reporters) of the 1960s and early 1970s to further develop the station's capabilities in serving the public. Jun Ricafrente, Radyo Patrol #3 (later transferred to Vic de Leon-Lima, now with DWIZ), one of the original members of the team, started training new recruits. The first of the 2nd generation reporters to be selected were RP #2 Claude Vitug, RP #4 Emil Recometa, RP #1 Lito Villarosa and RP #5 Neil Ocampo.

It was also in this year when military insurgents took over the station during the 1987 coup attempts. However, this did not stop DZMM from delivering news to the public, the booth was moved to then undisclosed location and immediately resumed broadcasting.

In 1989, DZMM eventually evolved into a 24-hour round-the-clock broadcast service, in keeping up with the demands of delivering the news to the listeners.

Failon, who is known for his distinct style of broadcasting, changed the landscape of Philippine radio broadcasting as he joined DZMM's roster of broadcasters the following year. And at the same time, he had a program with the station entitled Gising Pilipinas (originally known as Good Morning Pilipinas; unrelated to the now defunct morning show aired on PTV-4), formerly aired on weekdays from 2–4 am.

News coverages and events
Since 1986, DZMM reporters covered the biggest events in the late 80s and the early 90s like the Mendiola riot, August 1987 coup, Supertyphoon Sisang, MV Doña Paz tragedy, death of Ferdinand Marcos, December 1989 Christmas coup, Luzon earthquake, Mt. Pinatubo eruption and Gulf War. All of these were witnessed and listened on AM radio to listeners, together with ABS-CBN News team of reporters. These reports would be a source of pride for the station, reaping high praise from the public for its live and accurate reporting of news stories.

Public service on radio
In 1991, Aksyon Ngayon (Action Now), the first-ever program on AM radio devoted solely to public service was created. First anchored by Korina Sanchez and Ted Failon, Aksyon Ngayon instantly soared to the top of the ratings list. Because of the thousands of less-fortunate listeners flocking the station asking for assistance from the program, the executives decided to create DZMM Public Service Center, the first-ever separate office exclusively created for public service by a local AM station. However, Aksyon Ngayon aired its final broadcast on December 30, 2016, and was replaced by ABS-CBN Lingkod Kapamilya sa DZMM, hosted by Julius Babao and Bernadette Sembrano.

On November 5, 1993, DZMM launched Pulis, Pulis Kung Umaksiyon, Mabilis. The program was first anchored by broadcast icons, Noli de Castro, Jay Sonza, and Mel Tiangco. It was created to keep the public informed on the activities of the Philippine National Police. It also became a venue for comments and grievances of the listening public on issues concerning the law enforcers.

In 1996, DZMM became the first AM station in the Philippines to be made available in the World Wide Web with its inclusion in ABS-CBN website. All programs of the stations are broadcast live and can be enjoyed by Filipinos around the world via The Filipino Channel (TFC).

New slogan, Sky Patrol
In 1998, from Himpilan ng Malayang Mamamayan, DZMM, under the leadership of de Castro, then vice-president for Radio Network Division, was re-launched as DZMM Radyo Patrol 630 (named as counterpart of ABS-CBN's flagship primetime newscast, which de Castro is by then main anchor until 2001 and from 2010). By the end of 1999, DZMM moved its transmitting facilities from Libis, Caloocan since before martial law to the state-of-the-art 50,000-watt transmission equipment were moved to Obando, Bulacan.

On September 14, 1998, ABS-CBN Sky Patrol, the first-ever news chopper in the country, was launched. Anchored by Ricky Velasco, Sky Patrol changed the way of delivering and gathering news. ABS-CBN Sky Patrol is the news chopper of DZMM, ABS-CBN and the ABS-CBN News Channel. As of 2016, the Sky Patrol has been rarely used by the network and its sister stations, as it was replaced by video drones on 2017.

Kabayan
Since 1986, Kabayan (Kapangyarihan ng Mamamayan, Balita at Talakayan) is the longest-running radio program hosted by de Castro allowing to place a timeslot after DZMM Balita which focused on issues related to political and social situation. In February 2001, the last episodes of Kabayan (Kapangyarihan ng Mamamayan, Balita at Talakayan) aired. At the time, it was DZMM's top-rating morning radio program. The show had to end its run in order to allow de Castro to run for the Senate and the program was replaced by Todo Balita with RP #5 Neil Ocampo until 2010, when the show Kabayan (Kapangyarihan ng Mamamayan, Balita at Talakayan) officially returned to DZMM, with De Castro as the current host on Weekdays.

In 2001, DZMM celebrated its 15th anniversary of broadcasting on-air by adapting its richly deserved positioner, "Una sa Balita, Una sa Public Service" (First in News, First in Public Service). It was also on the same year when the station tapped the power of text messaging with DZMM TxtPatrol (via 2366).

DZMM's trademark drama theatre aired weekday afternoons, changing the way people perceived radio drama. The drama theatre featured the real life-stories of DZMM anchors like Bro. Jun Banaag, Joey Galvez, Sen. Alfredo Lim, and other personalities. It was also on the same year when Sports Talk was launched. This jam-packed sports-oriented program won CMMA's Best Sports Program on its first year of airing. Sports Talk was later renamed as Fastbreak since 2014.

On February 7, 2006, SikaPinoy was conferred with the Anvil Award of Merit by the celebrated Anvil Awards of the Public Relations Society of the Philippines (PRSP).

2006–2010
It was also in 2006 when DZMM celebrated its 20th anniversary in Araneta Coliseum with a bang- dubbed as Happy 20 DZMM. The theme of DZMM was given a different twist with Sharon Cuneta singing the anthem.

TeleRadyo is first televised via SkyCable channel 22 (then later channel 26), then later expanded on other cable providers and until eventually on the ABS-CBN TVplus as an exclusive news channel on digital free TV.

In 2010, for the first time in Philippine radio history, DZMM and its rival station DZBB of GMA Network made history as they joined forces in the name of public service, when they had two children named James and Jesus Bantillan, asked for help to find the missing parents named Pascual and Norma Bantillan from Bohol on the now defunct Aksyon Ngayon and eventually reunited through the defunct rival program Aksyon Oro Mismo of DZBB.

2011–2016
On February 25, 2011, DZMM introduced their tagline Silveradyo, celebrating their 25th anniversary. Takbo Para sa Karunungan (Literacy Run), a fun run succeeding Takbo Para sa Kalikasan, was held at the Quirino Grandstand on March 13, 2011.

A trade event of DZMM was held at One Esplanade at SM Mall of Asia in May 2011.

The new station ID for the station's 25th anniversary was launched on June 12, 2011. Philippine Philharmonic Orchestra, UP Concert Chorus, Erik Santos and Angeline Quinto performed the anthem.

In 2012, DZMM launched Red Alert (Response in Emergencies and Disasters) for regular citizens to prepare in times of natural calamities. The radio program temporarily went off the air, but returned in 2013 after the onslaught of Typhoon Yolanda (Haiyan). Because of this, the program became popular for its slogan Ligtas ang May Alam, and held various contests like Alert U and held the Red Alert Emergency Expo. Red Alert also became a TV program as a segment in Pinoy True Stories every Wednesday (formerly airs on Friday). The radio program later won different awards from the Philippine Quill Awards and the Hildegarde Awards respectively.

In 2013, Radyo Patrol 24 Jun Lingcoran was appointed as the chief of Radyo Patrol Reporters, and served in his position until he retired in 2015. Lingcoran died on April 8, 2016, due to complications from his esophageal cancer.

On April 19, 2016, the website of DZMM (dzmm.abs-cbnnews.com) was hacked by Bloodsec International and Anonymous Philippines, which both claimed responsibility of hacking the website. The hacking took place days before the final PiliPinas Debates 2016 presidential debates in Pangasinan, which was hosted by ABS-CBN and was also related to the COMELEC hacking, also done by Anonymous Philippines. The text posted by the hackers on that website said that our minds are constantly being invaded by legions of half-truths, prejudices, and false facts and the great needs of mankind is to be lifted above the morass of false propaganda. The hacking of the site did not affect their social media accounts nor the operations of the station and TeleRadyo, but did affect live streaming. The hacked website was later taken down by the mother network ABS-CBN and later replaced by a message that the site was down due to heavy traffic; days later the site was redirected to the main page of ABS-CBN News, but later replaced with a newer DZMM website (news.abs-cbn.com/dzmm/home).

30th anniversary (2016)
In 2016, DZMM 630 celebrated its 30th anniversary on the airwaves since its inception in 1986. The new music video (coinciding with the anniversary) performed by Kapamilya actor and singer Piolo Pascual was launched during the Isang Pamilya Tayo: The ABS-CBN Flag Raising Ceremony held on Philippine Independence Day, June 12, 2016. The music video for the newest station ID was premiered on July 1 following TV Patrol, which the full video of the station ID was aired on ABS-CBN, ABS-CBN HD and DZMM TeleRadyo. An audio-only edition of this station ID was also broadcast, but only aired on this station and through its live streaming. The slogan for its 30th anniversary is "Balita, Public Service, Tatlong Dekada". DZMM TeleRadyo also had a refurbished datascreen on the same day after the new station ID.

On July 22, 2016, exactly 30 years after its first sign-on, DZMM aired its anniversary special called Kuwento ng Tatlong Dekada ([The] Story of Three Decades), in different portions. An interview portion with former and present Radyo Patrol reporters #12 Rod Izon, #2 Claude Vitug, #26 Dindo Amparo and #38 Noel Alamar recalling the most notable stories of the past 30 years and their experiences was aired with Noli de Castro on Kabayan, while the most notable stories in the past 30 years were aired in between shows (mostly before) and some throwback remembrances are aired in some shows like Dr. Love Radio Show, Tandem: Lima at Oro, Dos Por Dos, Failon Ngayon, Pasada Sais Trenta, Todo-Todo Walang Preno, Aksyon Ngayon, Sakto, OMJ, Magandang Morning with Julius and Zen, Teka Muna, Usapang de Campanilla, Suhestiyon, Reaksyon at Opinyon, Ito ang Radyo Patrol, Radyo Patrol Balita Linggo and Omaga Diaz Report. A Grand Kapamilya Day was held in San Andres Sports Complex in Malate, Manila, as part of the anniversary festivities, which was led by ABS-CBN Integrated News and Current Affairs Head Ging Reyes, who opened the celebration. Aside from the public service fair, DZMM also launched their first outside broadcast news van to be used for breaking news and special coverages. The 30th anniversary capped off with a grand anniversary celebration on October 4, 2016, at the Marriott Grand Ballroom, Pasay and a documentary special 30 630 (Trenta Sais Trenta): Kwento ng DZMM narrated by Vic de Leon Lima was aired on October 9, 2016, on ABS-CBN's Sunday's Best, with replays on October 10 and 15, 2016 on DZMM, DZMM TeleRadyo and news.abs-cbn.com/dzmm/home and re-aired again on November 6, 2016, on Jeepney TV and December 30, 2016, on all mentioned DZMM platforms.

2017–2020: TeleRadyo's 10th anniversary, expansion of programming
In March 2017, DZMM and DZMM TeleRadyo launched DZMM Kapamilya Day to celebrate the television counterpart's tenth anniversary, as well as the continuation of the radio counterpart's 30th anniversary. With the launch of Kapamilya Day, most of its weekday (excluding Radyo Patrol Balita, overnight, its radio musical programs and TeleRadyo-only programming) and some of its weekend programming were broadcast live in different parts of Metro Manila and in select areas in Laguna, Cavite and Bulacan. Kapamilya Day ended in June 2017, but returned in January 2018.

On April 17, 2017, DZMM and DZMM TeleRadyo underwent programming changes for the relaunch of the ABS-CBN's late-night newscast Bandila, which it became a standalone broadcast for both DZMM and DZMM TeleRadyo while the main edition on ABS-CBN will be retained unlike prior to 2011 when it was simulcast on a slightly-delayed basis on DZMM and DZMM TeleRadyo. Due to the change also, Mismo moved to a later timeslot of 10:30 p.m.

On June 16, 2017, Dr. Love: Always and Forever, Magandang Gabi Dok and Radyo Patrol Balita: Alas Kwatro aired its final broadcasts to give way to new programming. Two days later, DZMM launched three new programs to replace the 3 programs airing their final broadcasts two days earlier, Good Vibes, On the Spot and Wow Trending, which the latter only airs on the station to fill the gap to TeleRadyo's broadcast of ABS-CBN's weekend programming (which was launched on April 17, 2017). Due to the change also, MMK sa DZMM moved to a later timeslot of 2:00 p.m. to also fill the gap of the television counterpart's latter and Usapang de Campanilla has moved to the early timeslot of 8:30 p.m. Headline Pilipinas and ABS-CBN's late-night programming began simulcasting on this station, which prior to that, it was only available on TeleRadyo. Mismo was renamed Showbuzz (which was also a showbiz news segment for Radyo Patrol Balita: Alas Dose, then Headline Pilipinas) a month later.

The station also launched a new studio on the same day for its weekday programs like Good Vibes, Sakto, On the Spot and Todo-Todo, Walang Preno; it is planned that the studio will be used in other programming soon as its television counterpart is transitioning into a full-fledged Filipino-language news channel.

On July 3, 2017, DZMM launched its new station ID and jingle with the theme Una Ka Pilipino (lit. You Are The Leader, Filipino). DZMM's weekday morning lifestyle program, Sakto, updated its title card on DZMM TeleRadyo on the same day. This is the first DZMM program to update its title card.

On January 18, 2018, Sa Kabukiran long-time anchor Ka Louie Tabing, died of heart attack at his hometown in Tanauan, Batangas, at the age of 73. Dexter Ganibe replaced him as the new host of the said program until 2019, Ganibe was replaced by Rod Izon.

On February 3, 2018, the Saturday edition of Yesterday, aired its final broadcast to give way to new programming. But it only airs on Sunday at 12:30 p.m., as of February 10, 2018, one day later, DZMM launched two new programs to replace the said program airing final broadcast one day earlier, Healthy Sabado (then-hosted by Dr. Harris Acero and Aida Gonzales, later hosted by Jing Castañeda) and Songhits: Tunog Pinoy.

On February 4, 2018, DZMM has launched its new program Konek-Todo, hosted by Mare Yao and Presidential Spokesperson Sec. Harry Roque which was aired at 8:00 p.m., that tackles the important issues in our country and giving solutions from the rightful authorities, replacing the last 30 minutes of Chismax and the first 30 minutes of Salitang Buhay. Due to the change also, Salitang Buhay moved to a later timeslot of 9:00 p.m.

On April 8, 2018, DZMM has launched its new program Tulong Ko, Pasa Mo (lit. Help Me, Pass On) (hosted by the power couple Vic & Avelynn Garcia), replacing Radyo Patrol Balita Linggo. It was originally aired on DZAS 702 and Radyo5 92.3 News FM in 2016, but it transferred to DZMM on the same day. It airs every Sunday at 11:00 a.m.

On June 2, 2018, DZMM has launched its new program Kape at Salita (lit. Coffee and Words), (hosted by Bro. Bo Sanchez together with Bro. Randy Borromeo, Alvin Barcelona, and Rissa Singson Kawpeng), replacing the last hour of the Saturday edition of Sa Kabukiran. It airs every Saturdays from 5:00 a.m. to 6:00 a.m. It simulcasts on ABS-CBN Channel 2 from 5:30 a.m. to 6:00 a.m.

On October 15, 2018, two DZMM Programs (Pasada Sais Trenta and Sakto) introduces new program hosts, Matanglawin anchor and TV Patrol weatherman Kim Atienza, which replaced original host Marc Logan who left the show in September 2018, and former Teka Muna anchors Peter Musñgi and Pat-P Daza, which replaced original hosts Karen Davila (2017) and Vic Lima (2018) who were both left the show. Former Sakto host Marc Logan also joined the Saturday morning program Tandem, replacing David Oro. DZMM's weekday morning lifestyle program, Sakto, updated its title card once again, and Pasada Sais Trenta (also known as Pasada 630) also updated its title card on DZMM TeleRadyo. This is the second DZMM program to update its title card, same as with Tandem.

On November 10, 2018, Teka Muna aired its final episode to give way to the 30-minute extension of S.O.C.O. and Radyo Negosyo had moved to an early timeslot of 7:30 p.m.

On November 24, 2018, DZMM has launched its new program Haybol Pinoy, replacing Songhits: Tunog Pinoy. It was originally aired from 1992 to 2004 and it is now hosted by Tina Marasigan and Atty. Terry Ridon.

On February 17, 2019, DZMM has launched its new program Magsasaka TV (hosted by Jeff Hernaez and Dexter Villamin), replacing the last hour of the Sunday edition of Sa Kabukiran. It airs every Sundays from 5:00 a.m. to 6:00 a.m.

On March 24, 2019, DZMM has launched its new program Pinoy Panalo Ka! (lit. You are winner, Pinoy!), (hosted by Mare Yao and DJ Chacha), replacing Konek-Todo (which aired its final broadcast on January 27, 2019, and was temporarily replaced by documentaries of ABS-CBN News), and also aired at 8:00 p.m., that tackles the important issues in the country and giving solutions from the rightful authorities, facts, trivia and inspiring stories.

On May 20, 2019, Bandila sa DZMM aired its final episode to give way to the new timeslot of ABS-CBN's Current Affairs programs, as well as S.R.O. extending for 30 minutes, and Usapang de Campanilla going back to its original timeslot, 9:00 p.m. to 10:00 p.m. (9:00 p.m. to 9:30 p.m. on DZMM TeleRadyo). Due to the change also, MMK Klasiks was moved to a later timeslot of 9:30 p.m. on DZMM TeleRadyo.

On June 22, 2019, DZMM has launched its new program Good Job!, replacing Haybol Pinoy (which aired its final broadcast on June 8, 2019, and was temporarily replaced by two replayed ABS-CBN midnight programs, My Puhunan and Mission Possible). It is hosted by Rica Lazo and former ABS-CBN Europe News Bureau Chief Danny Buenafe.

On July 19, 2019, Radyo Patrol Balita Alas-Dose aired its final episode to give way to the expansion of Headline Pilipinas which had moved to an early timeslot of 12:00 p.m.

On January 27, 2020, DZMM has refurbished its title cards of most DZMM programs such as Failon Ngayon sa DZMM, Garantisadong Balita, Radyo Patrol Balita, Gising Pilipinas, Kabayan, Good Vibes, Todo-Todo Walang Preno, S.O.C.O. sa DZMM, On the Spot, Dos por Dos, S.R.O. and Pasada Sais Trenta.

On February 14, 2020, Just in time for the celebration of Valentine's Day, DZMM has launched its new program LOL: Labor of Love, (hosted by Arnell Ignacio and Rica Lazo), replacing the Friday edition of Usapang de Campanilla as well as MMK Klasiks on DZMM TeleRadyo. It airs Friday nights from 9:00 p.m. to 10:00 p.m.

On February 15, 2020, DZMM has launched its new program, Usapang Kalye (hosted by "Manong" Tim Orbos and Tina Marasigan), replacing Healthy Sabado. It airs every Saturdays from 1:00 p.m. to 2:00 p.m. On the same day, Headline Pilipinas started airing on weekends, replacing Radyo Patrol Balita Alas-Dose Weekend and Ito ang Radyo Patrol (which ended on February 8). However, it is set in a DZMM Studio instead of its main studio, as well as the introduction of weekend anchors, Joyce Balancio and Ricky Rosales presenting on Saturdays and Adrian Ayalin and Raya Capulong on Sundays. However, the Sunday edition runs at 30 minutes given that Yesterday airs at 12:30pm afterwards, while the Saturday edition runs for a full hour like the weekday editions.

On February 16, 2020, Chismax and Salitang Buhay both reverted to its original timeslots, 7:00 p.m. to 8:30 p.m., and 8:30 p.m. to 10:00 p.m., replacing Pinoy, Panalo Ka!.

On March 14, 2020, DZMM has launched its new program, Kuwentuhang Lokal (hosted by Jay Ruiz, DILG Sec. Eduardo Año, Usec. Jonathan Malaya and Raya Capulong), replacing Turo-Turo. It airs every Saturdays from 5:00 p.m. to 6:00 p.m.

On March 15, 2020, DZMM's music program (Remember When) introduces new program host, DJ Reggie Valdez, which replaced original host Norma Marco who left the show in February 2020.

2020: COVID-19 programming changes and forced shutdown

On March 18, 2020, ABS-CBN revives its weekday morning line-up with DZMM morning programs for the first time in the years as provisional programming, temporarily replacing the broadcasts of Umagang Kay Ganda and all ABS-CBN Regional morning programming, which were ordered to halt in order to support government efforts to fight COVID-19, leading to the television simulcasts, nationwide, of Garantisadong Balita, Kabayan and Radyo Patrol Balita Alas Siyete, all DZMM-AM programs. On the same day, the ANC, as an emergency measure, temporary simulcasts DZMM programs to local and international viewers but with own commercials, cutting its feed for the flagship Top Story.

On March 19, 2020, DZMM, formally stopped temporary the replay broadcasts of ABS-CBN News and Current Affairs programming at 1:00 p.m. (which began Monday as a result of the decision for the temporary halt of broadcasts of Good Vibes) and replaces them with a news simulcast from the ABS-CBN News Channel, another unprecedended decision, thus DZMM becomes the first radio station in many years, since the end of English broadcasts on DZRJ in the 2010s, to air English language news programming on the AM brand and by extension DZMM TeleRadyo becomes a pioneer in airing bilingual (Filipino and English) news programming in both cable and digital FTA television. The English broadcasts air from 1:00 p.m. (following Headline Pilipinas) to 10:00 p.m., Tuesdays, Thursdays and Sundays, with ANC's relay of DZMM programs on Mondays, Wednesdays, Fridays and Saturdays (Mondays, Wednesdays and Fridays starting at 8:00 a.m. to 10:00 p.m. following Early Edition), with a break at 9:00 a.m. for Market Edge during trading days in the Philippine Stock Exchange and 5:00 p.m. for Top Story. With this decision, DZMM TeleRadyo airs The World Tonight for the first time on FTA digital television on Tuesday, Thursday and Sunday nights for the first time since 1999, while taking a 6:30 p.m. break for the live simulcast of TV Patrol (weekdays only). After 10:00 p.m., DZMM 630 switches to hookup to sister station MOR 101.9, while TeleRadyo continues its simulcast of ANC regardless of schedule.

On March 20, 2020, DZMM made history with the use of Zoom videotelephony software for the Friday night broadcasts of Labor of Love, Saturday afternoon broadcasts of Usapang Kalye, Good Job and Omaga-Diaz Report are simulcast on ANC, making it a pioneer among the country's news channels.

On March 22, 2020, DZMM TeleRadyo moved to full 24/7 broadcasts provisionally on digital free-to-air and cable, with ANC programming being aired on Sunday late nights till 4:30 a.m. Mondays.

On March 25, 2020, Headline Pilipinas aired for 90 minutes on DZMM TeleRadyo (and on ANC on Mondays, Wednesdays and Fridays) instead of the usual full hour as a provisional measure.

On April 1, 2020, Kuwentuhang Lokal and Pasada 630 became the first DZMM programs to be aired fully using the Zoom platform. On the same day, DZMM Radyo Patrol 630 and DZMM TeleRadyo switched to simultaneous telecast with the English language ABS-CBN News Channel (ANC) starting at 10:00 p.m. As DZMM temporarily suspended its regular programming after asking all concerned on-duty personnel to go on self-quarantine for 14 days following their exposure to two Persons Under Investigation. The studio and facilities of DZMM were vacated and immediately disinfected. Those who have not been exposed shall work from home. With this move, DZMM and DZMM TeleRadyo, as well as the provincial regional AM radio stations, became English-only as a provisional measure. From 5:30 p.m. to 10:00 p.m., the channel aired the best of ABS-CBN News and Current Affairs programming in their place with a 6:30 p.m. break for TV Patrol.

On April 3, 2020, DZMM Radyo Patrol 630 and DZMM TeleRadyo resumed transmission, with all programming aired via the Zoom platform; as DZMM TeleRadyo shared infrastructure, graphics, and commercials from ANC.

On April 9–11, 2020, by virtue of a partnership between the Church of Jesus Christ of Latter-day Saints in the Philippines, given the effects of the enhanced community quarantine in Luzon and many other provinces, the 190th General Conference of the Church of Jesus Christ of Latter-Day Saints, aired from the Conference Center in Temple Square, Salt Lake City, Utah, USA was officially broadcast countrywide on both free-to-air and cable on DZMM TeleRadyo during the Easter Triduum period, making it the first time it had been ever done via satellite delay. All the broadcasts on DZMM TeleRadyo on the same days were also simulcast as well on ANC. This event was the very first time it had aired on Philippine television.

On April 13, 2020, commercial feeds for ANC and DZMM TeleRadyo for Mondays, Wednesdays, Fridays and Saturdays are now separated after days of using a singular commercial feed. In addition, DZMM and DZMM TeleRadyo now resumed the use of the radio studios following disinfection measures, with SRO: Suhestyon, Reaksyon at Opinion as the first broadcast to be aired from there.

On April 20, 2020, after four weeks, the timesharing of programming between both DZMM TeleRadyo and ANC ended. ANC now resumed its programming on Mondays and DZMM slowly resuming broadcasts from the radio studios, though some programs are still produced through Zoom. On the same day, Headline Pilipinas now extends its time slot on DZMM TeleRadyo, starting at 12:15 p.m. and ending at 2:00 p.m. to accommodate more national and local reports. However, the overnight simulcasts on MOR 101.9 (for radio) and ANC (for TeleRadyo) were retained and broadcast after Dr. Love Radio Show starting at 11:00pm.

On May 5, 2020, the station together with its ABS-CBN, S+A, and MOR Philippines were ordered by the National Telecommunications Commission to sign off at 7:52 pm due to its expiration of its franchise the day before. At 8:20 pm, DZMM and its television counterpart went off the air following S.R.O.: Suhestyon, Reaksyon at Opinyon.

On May 7, 2020, ABS-CBN filed a motion for a temporary restraining order (TRO) with the Supreme Court of the Philippines to stop the implementation of the NTC's cease-and-desist order and to allow the DZMM and other ABS-CBN TV and radio stations to return to the airwaves whilst proceedings related to its franchise renewal were ongoing.

From DZMM TeleRadyo to TeleRadyo

At 05:00 (Philippine Standard Time) on May 8, 2020, DZMM-AM's television counterpart resumed operations, this time with its new name TeleRadyo with its refurbished logo and bumper, and its general commentary program, Pasada 630, was renamed Pasada sa TeleRadyo on the same day. However, the DZMM name is retained on its station bumper and its old DZMM TeleRadyo logo was reverted moments later. DZMM's online audio feed also resumed.

On May 10, 2020, its television counterpart had its refurbished bumper and logo on use permanently.

On May 13, 2020, a bill to grant ABS-CBN a provisional franchise (which will allow DZMM-AM to return to the airwaves whilst legislative proceedings for a longer-term franchise is ongoing) until October 31, 2020, was approved at the House of Representatives on second reading. It is still awaiting approval on third reading and if successful, the bill will go to the Senate for consideration.

On May 17, 2020, TeleRadyo's first all new program debuted, the Sunday morning public service program Lingkod Aksyon co-produced with the Philippine Red Cross, with Henry Omaga-Diaz and PRC Chairman of the Board of Governors Senator Richard J. Gordon hosting. It airs as provisional replacement of Ma-Beauty Po Naman.

On June 10, 2020, Lingkod Kapamilya sa TeleRadyo, hosted by Bernadette Sembrano and Julius Babao, has expanded to two hours (10am to 12pm). Previously on March 17, the program has moved to 10am slot provisionally replacing Sakto to give way for the airing of PTV's "Public Briefing #LagingHandaPH" until June 9.

On June 16, 2020, Health and infotainment program Good Vibes has returned this time on TeleRadyo, remotely hosted by Niña Corpuz with Ahwel Paz and Dra. Luisa, replacing the 2pm edition of TeleRadyo special coverage on COVID-19 pandemic.

On July 31, 2020, Dos Por Dos and Garantisadong Balita both air its final episodes after Gerry Baja and Anthony Taberna had announced on their programs that they will leave ABS-CBN, and it is now replaced by Kapamilya Daily Mass (through its hook-up via the Kapamilya Channel except Saturdays) and the expansion of Pasada sa TeleRadyo.

On August 22 and 23, 2020, some TeleRadyo programs were ended namely Tandem: Lima at Logan, Magpayo Nga Kayo, Red Alert sa TeleRadyo, and Dra. Bles @ Ur Serbis.

On August 28, 2020, Todo-Todo Walang Preno, Good Vibes and the weekday edition of Dr. Love Radio Show have aired its final episodes as well.

On August 31, 2020, Failon Ngayon sa TeleRadyo aired its final episode due to Ted Failon and DJ Chacha leaving ABS-CBN, and it is now replaced by On the Spot on its vacated timeslot.

On September 21, 2020, Kabayan began airing at its new timeslot at 8:00 a.m., limiting it back to a runtime of one hour, to make way for the return of Gising Pilipinas at 6:00 am. The move temporarily ended its simulcast on Kapamilya Channel before resuming again on October 26.

On October 26, 2020, News and entertainment program Sakto has returned this time on TeleRadyo (hosted by Amy Perez; this time with new hosts, Jeff Canoy and Johnson Manabat), this time in an earlier timeslot, which runs from 6:00 a.m. to 7:30 a.m., replacing Gising Pilipinas. It is also simulcasted on Kapamilya Channel. On the same day, On the Spot was also moved to a new timeslot, which runs from 9:00 a.m. to 10:30 a.m. before Lingkod Kapamilya sa TeleRadyo. 

On December 27, 2020, Yesterday has aired its final episode after 10 years of broadcasting due to DJ Richard Enriquez returning to his original station, DWDM-FM, after 11 years of broadcasting.

Programs

Notable personalities

Doris Bigornia
Jeff Canoy
Winnie Cordero
Noli de Castro
Alvin Elchico
Gretchen Fullido
Karen Davila
Tina Marasigan
Peter Musñgi 
Henry Omaga-Diaz
Amy Perez
Karmina Constantino
Bernadette Sembrano
Marc Logan
Salve Duplito
Tony Velasquez
Fr. Tito Caluag
Jeffrey Hernaez
Johnson Manabat
Junry Hidalgo
Melanie Severino
Dexter Ganibe
Dra. Luisa
Dra. Maria Josefina Arilay
Ahwel Paz
Edric Calma
Rod Izon
Zen Hernandez
May Valle-Ceniza
Ruby Tayag
Neil Badion
Noel Alamar
Rica Lazo
Danny Buenafe
MJ Felipe
Raya Capulong
Jing Castañeda
Joyce Balancio
Vic Garcia
Avelynn Garcia
Adrian Ayalin
Kori Quintos
Nikki de Guzman
Rhoda Castro-Caliwara

Former

Theme music
From 1986 to 2004 (prior to the launch of its own theme music), its on-air identifications' background music was the jingle of its mother network ABS-CBN.

The now-iconic DZMM jingle was first composed in 2005 by Jessie Lasaten, with words of Bing Palao, Robert Labayen, and Peter Musñgi (former host of Teka Muna, then later became the new host of Pasada Sais Trenta, and consultant of ABS-CBN Sports and the current voiceover of the network), and sung by Reuben Laurente, a former member of the music group The Company. Other singers who performed their renditions of the jingle (which was recomposed, rearranged and modified several times) include Rachelle Ann Go, Sheryn Regis, Sharon Cuneta (for their 20th anniversary in 2006), Gary Valenciano (Christmas 2006), Charice (2008, re-used in 2010), Richard Poon (Christmas 2009), Jed Madela (2010), Christian Bautista (Christmas 2010), Erik Santos and Angeline Quinto with the UP Concert Chorus and the Philippine Philharmonic Orchestra (for their 25th anniversary in 2011), Yeng Constantino and Jovit Baldivino (Christmas 2011), Noel Cabangon and Zia Quizon (2012), Nonoy Zuñiga (Christmas 2012), Teddy Corpuz of Rocksteddy (Election 2013), Arnel Pineda (2014), Lani Misalucha (Christmas 2014-2016), Piolo Pascual (for their 30th anniversary in 2016) and Regine Velasquez-Alcasid (2018; performed once). The jingle was also sung by its on-air personalities in Christmas 2013.

ABS-CBN Radyo Patrol AM stations

Radyo Patrol is also broadcast to 3 provincial stations in the Philippines.

See also
ABS-CBN
ABS-CBN News and Current Affairs
MOR 101.9
TeleRadyo (a 24-hour Filipino-language cable news and talk channel)

References

External links
Media Ownership Monitor Philippines – Radio by VERA Files and Reporters Without Borders

1953 establishments in the Philippines
Assets owned by ABS-CBN Corporation
News and talk radio stations in the Philippines
Radyo Patrol stations
Radio stations established in 1953
Defunct radio stations in Metro Manila
Radio stations disestablished in 2020
2020 disestablishments in the Philippines